Eddy Santana Putra (born 20 January 1957) is an Indonesian politician who served as the mayor of Palembang between 2003 and 2013. He was a member of PDI-P until 2018, when he moved to Gerindra. Originating from Pangkal Pinang, he was elected through both a city council vote and direct popular vote.

Background
Eddy Santana Putra was born in Pangkal Pinang, South Sumatra (today Bangka Belitung Islands) on 20 January 1957. After completing high school at Xaverius 1 High School, he went to Sriwijaya University, from which he earned a bachelors of civil engineering and a masters of engineering.

Career
Before entering politics, Eddy was a civil servant at South Sumatra provincial government's public works department.

Mayor
Eddy first became the mayor of Palembang following a vote by the city council in 2003. In Palembang's first direct mayoral election in 2008, Eddy ran for a second term with PDI-P's support and Romi Herton as his running mate, winning with 335,591 votes (51%).

In addition, he ran as a candidate for PDI-P's provincial leadership in the party's 2005 South Sumatra congress, despite then being a member of Golkar. He eventually served two terms in that position.

ASEAN gave the city a "Clean Land for Big Cities" recognition during its 2nd Environmentally Sustainable Cities Award in November 2011.

His second term expired on 21 July 2013, and he was succeeded by Romi Herton. He ran for governorship of South Sumatra in the 2013 gubernatorial election, but placed third behind incumbent governor Alex Noerdin and East Ogan Komering Ulu regent Herman Deru.

Post-mayorship
In the 2018 mayoral election for Palembang, Eddy opposed the incumbent candidate Harnojoyo against his party PDI-P's position. He later quit the party and joined Gerindra, running in the 2019 legislative election as a People's Representative Council candidate from South Sumatra's 1st electoral district. He won 64,397 votes - the most in the district - and secured a seat.

Personal life
He was married to Srimaya Hariyanti until 2011, when divorce proceedings were filed and the case was brought up to the Supreme Court of Indonesia. Eddy later remarried Eva Ajeng, a model. Eddy and Srimaya had two children.

References

1957 births
Living people
Mayors and regents of places in South Sumatra
People from Palembang
People from Pangkal Pinang
Great Indonesia Movement Party politicians
Members of the People's Representative Council, 2019
Mayors of places in Indonesia
Sriwijaya University alumni